King Ikshvaku was the founder of the Ikshvaku dynasty 
 Ikshvaku, mythological King in Hindu epics

Ikshvaku can also refer to:
Ikshvaku dynasty, the ruling dynasty of ancient Kosala
Andhra Ikshvaku, an early ruling dynasty of Andhra Pradesh
Scion of Ikshvaku, a fantasy book written by Indian author Amish Tripathi